Freezing is a Japanese manga series written by Dall-Young Lim and illustrated by Kwang-Hyun Kim. The series revolves around an extraterrestrial force called the Nova that are invading Earth, and genetically engineered girls called Pandoras and their male partners called Limiters are created to combat them. The story centers on Kazuya Aoi, a Limiter whose late sister was a Pandora, and Satellizer el Bridget, a Pandora with a cold personality who is known as the "Untouchable Queen" for her intense fear of being touched. Both are enrolled at West Genetics Academy, which is a special school that is part of a series of academies that trains Pandoras and Limiters alike to fight against the Nova.

Freezing started serialization in Kill Time Communication's seinen manga magazine Comic Valkyrie in its March 2007 issue, published on January 27, 2007. The first tankōbon was released on October 26, 2007, with a total of twenty-five volumes sold in Japan as of October 25, 2014 under its Valkryie Comics imprint. Freezing is currently split into two parts: Part 1 which ran from Volume 1 to Volume 14, spanning 96 chapters; and Part 2, going from Volume 15 onwards and currently ongoing in Comic Valkyrie.

A spinoff manga, called , illustrated by Jae-Ho Yoon (the illustrator of Lim's light novel-based manhwa The Phantom King), began serialization in the November 2011 issue of Comic Valkyrie (released on September 27, 2011), and ran four chapters until the March 2012 issue (released January 27, 2012). A prequel to the original series, the story centers on Chiffon Fairchild and Ticy Phenyl's first year at West Genetics prior to them becoming Student Council President and Vice President, and also explains the origin of Chiffon's title, "The Unmatched Smiling Monster". First Chronicle was later released as a tankōbon volume on February 29, 2012.

A second spinoff manga, called , illustrated by Soo-Cheol Jeong (the illustrator of Lim's novel-based manhwa The Legend of Maian), began serialization in the May 2012 issue of Comic Valkyrie (published on March 27, 2012) and ended on September 4, 2015. Like First Chronicle before it, Zero is also a prequel to the original series, chronicling the back stories of many Pandoras prior to them attending Genetics. The first bound volume of Zero was released on August 29, 2012. Zero was collected into nine volumes.  A third spinoff, called , was serialized from April 2013 to March 2014 issues of Comic Valkyrie and collected in three volumes.

Outside Japan, Freezing is published in South Korea by Haksan Culture Company, where it is serialized in Booking; in France by Bamboo Edition under their Doki-Doki manga imprint; and in Taiwan by Tong Li Publishing. A 12-episode anime adaptation by A.C.G.T. aired in Japan between January and April 2011 on AT-X and other channels.

Volume list

Part 1: Volumes 1-14
The English omnibus editions are published by Seven Seas Entertainment with two volumes per book.

Part 2: Volumes 15-29

Part 3: Volumes 30-

Spin-offs

Freezing: First Chronicle

Freezing: Zero

Freezing Pair Love Stories

Notes

References

Freezing chapters